Vladimir Rokhlin Jr. (born August 4, 1952) is a mathematician and professor of computer science and mathematics at Yale University. He is the co-inventor with Leslie Greengard of the fast multipole method (FMM) in 1985, recognised as one of the top-ten algorithms of the 20th century.

In 2008, Rokhlin was elected as a member into the National Academy of Engineering for the development of fast multipole algorithms and their application to electromagnetic and acoustic scattering.

Short biography
Vladimir Rokhlin Jr. was born on August 4, 1952 in Voronezh, USSR (now Russia). In 1973 he received a M.S. in mathematics from the University of Vilnius in Lithuania, and in 1983 a Ph.D. in applied mathematics from Rice University located in Houston, Texas, United States.  In 1985 Rokhlin started working at Yale University located in New Haven, Connecticut, United States, where he is now professor of computer science and mathematics.

He is the son of Soviet mathematician Vladimir Abramovich Rokhlin.

Awards and honors
Rokhlin has received several awards and honors, including:
 the Leroy P. Steele Prize for Seminal Contribution to Research from the American Mathematical Society in 2001 (together with Leslie F. Greengard), for their paper describing a new algorithm: the fast multipole method (FMM)
 the "Rice University Distinguished Alumni Award" in 2001
 elected a member of both the U.S. National Academy of Engineering (2008) and the U.S. National Academy of Sciences (1999)
 the IEEE Honorary Membership in 2006.
 elected to fellow of the Society for Industrial and Applied Mathematics in 2009
 the ICIAM Maxwell Prize from the International Council for Industrial and Applied Mathematics in 2011
 The William Benter Prize in Applied Mathematics from the Liu Bie Ju Centre for Mathematical Sciences in 2014
 Fellow of the American Academy of Arts and Sciences, 2016

References

External links

Russian mathematicians
Russian inventors
Soviet emigrants to the United States
American people of Russian-Jewish descent
Fellows of the Society for Industrial and Applied Mathematics
Rice University alumni
Vilnius University alumni
Yale University faculty
20th-century American mathematicians
21st-century American mathematicians
Living people
1952 births
Members of the United States National Academy of Sciences
Members of the United States National Academy of Engineering
Fellows of the American Academy of Arts and Sciences